Ángel Gastón Díaz (born March 26, 1981) is an Argentinian former footballer who played as a midfielder.

In the 2006–07 season, Díaz played in Romania for Ceahlăul Piatra Neamţ in the First Division, and for FC Brașov in the second half of the season in the Second Division.

References

External links

1981 births
Living people
Sportspeople from Buenos Aires Province
Association football midfielders
Argentine expatriate footballers
Argentine footballers
Liga I players
Liga II players
CSM Ceahlăul Piatra Neamț players
Expatriate footballers in Romania
FC Brașov (1936) players
Club Atlético Sarmiento footballers
Club Atlético Tigre footballers
Aldosivi footballers